Chamberlain Group (CGI), the corporate parent company to LiftMaster, Chamberlain, Merlin, and Grifco, designs and engineers residential garage door openers, commercial door operators, and gate entry systems.

CGI is also the parent company to Controlled Products Systems Group, the largest wholesale distributor of perimeter access control equipment in the United States.

In September 2021, The Duchossois Group sold the Chamberlain Group to Blackstone.

Product lines
 Chamberlain — the company's do-it-yourself line of garage door openers.
 LiftMaster — the company's line of garage door openers for professional installers.
 Raynor — the company's line of garage door openers for professional installers. This line of professional installers is slightly less common than LiftMaster.
 Craftsman — re-branded Chamberlain models sold at Sears. Those products have a "139" model prefix to denote that the Chamberlain Group made them for Sears.
 Clicker — a line of universal garage door remotes.

Chamberlain, LiftMaster, and Craftsman have interchangeable parts, primarily the gear and circuit boards. The greatest difference between the brands is that Chamberlain and Craftsman operate on a split-rail system, while LiftMaster consists of one single solid piece of rail.

Partnerships
Chamberlain's "myQ" technology is embedded in garage door openers and lights, can be added to Wi-Fi networks to control these devices and is being incorporated into future home products. At CES 2019, Chamberlain announced a partnership with Amazon, allowing packages to be placed in customers garages with myQ openers, as part of the Amazon Key service.

References

Garage door opener manufacturers
Electronics companies established in 1954
Companies based in DuPage County, Illinois
Elmhurst, Illinois
American companies established in 1954
1954 establishments in Illinois